Larry Laudan (October 16, 1941 – August 23, 2022) was an American philosopher of science and epistemologist. He strongly criticized the traditions of positivism, realism, and relativism, and he defended a view of science as a privileged and progressive institution against popular challenges. Laudan's philosophical view of "research traditions" is seen as an important alternative to Imre Lakatos's "research programs".

Life and career
Laudan earned his PhD in Philosophy at Princeton University, and then taught at University College London and, for many years, at the University of Pittsburgh.  Subsequently, he taught at the Virginia Polytechnic Institute & State University, University of Hawaii and the National Autonomous University of Mexico. Despite his official retirement, Laudan continued lecturing at the University of Texas, Austin. His later work was on legal epistemology. He was the husband of food historian Rachel Laudan.

Philosophical work
Laudan's most influential book is Progress and Its Problems (1977), in which he charges philosophers of science with paying lip service to the view that "science is fundamentally a problem-solving activity" without taking seriously the view's implications for the history of science and its philosophy, and without questioning certain issues in the historiography and methodology of science. Against empiricism, which is represented by Karl Popper, and "revolutionism," represented by Thomas Kuhn, Laudan maintained in Progress and Its Problems that science is an evolving process that accumulates more empirically validated evidence while solving conceptual anomalies at the same time. Mere evidence collecting or empirical confirmation does not constitute the true mechanism of scientific advancement; conceptual resolution and comparison of the solutions of anomalies provided by various theories form an indispensable part of the evolution of science.

Laudan is particularly well known for his pessimistic induction argument against the claim that the cumulative success of science shows that science must truly describe reality.  Laudan famously argued in his 1981 article "A Confutation of Convergent Realism" that "the history of science furnishes vast evidence of empirically successful theories that were later rejected; from subsequent perspectives, their unobservable terms were judged not to refer and thus, they cannot be regarded as true or even approximately true."

In Beyond Positivism and Relativism, Laudan wrote that "the aim of science is to secure theories with a high problem-solving effectiveness" and that scientific progress is possible when empirical data is diminished.  "Indeed, on this model, it is possible that a change from an empirically well-supported theory to a less well-supported one could be progressive, provided that the latter resolved significant conceptual difficulties confronting the former." Finally, the better theory solves more conceptual problems while minimizing empirical anomalies.

Laudan has also written on risk management and the subject of terrorism. He has argued that "moral outrage and compassion are the proper responses to terrorism, but fear for oneself and one's life is not. The risk that the average American will be a victim of terrorism is extremely remote." He wrote The Book of Risks in 1996 which details the relative risks of various accidents.

Controversy
In 1990, while Chair of Philosophy at the University of Hawaii, Laudan was critical of fellow professor Haunani-Kay Trask, over a debate in the local newspapers regarding her claims about white supremacy and the colonisation of Hawaii. Laudan "demanded" to a Vice President of the University that Trask be reprimanded for her published comments. Later on, the Philosophy Department that Laudan chaired issued a public "Statement on Racism in Academe" condemning Trask's remarks.

In September 2021, following Trask’s death, the University of Hawaii at Mānoa philosophy department recognized that the accusations of racism that Laudan (among others) made against Haunani-Kay Trask were entirely baseless, and “apologize[d] sincerely for the attacks [Trask] suffered from philosophers at Mānoa in the past.” The University of Hawaii philosophy department addressed its apology not only to Trask but also the “wider community of Kānaka ʻŌiwi faculty and students” because Laudan’s accusations against Trask “left lasting wounds among Native Hawaiian faculty and students.” The philosophy department recognized that its members “had a moral obligation to reach out” and apologize for the actions of its past members, such as Laudan.

Selected writings
1977. Progress and Its Problems: Towards a Theory of Scientific Growth, 
1981. Science and Hypothesis
1983. The Demise of the Demarcation Problem
1984. Science and Values: The Aims of Science and Their Role in Scientific Debate, 
1990. Science and Relativism: Dialogues on the Philosophy of Science, 
1995. The Book of Risks
1996. Beyond Positivism and Relativism, 
1997. Danger Ahead
2006. Truth, Error and Criminal Law: An Essay in Legal Epistemology
2016. The Law's Flaws: Rethinking Trials and Errors?

References

External links

 Larry Laudan (www.larrylaudan.com)
 Pragmatism Cybrary Profile
 

1941 births
2022 deaths
Philosophers of science
University of Kansas alumni
Princeton University alumni
Academics of University College London
Academic staff of the National Autonomous University of Mexico
Larry Laudan (Philosopher of Science)
University of Hawaiʻi faculty
Virginia Tech faculty
University of Texas faculty
Epistemologists
Philosophers of law
Writers from Austin, Texas
20th-century American philosophers
21st-century American philosophers